Stirratt is a surname. Notable people with the surname include:

John Stirratt (born 1967), American bassist and multi-instrumentalist
Laurie Stirratt, member of Blue Mountain

See also
 Stirrat (disambiguation)